Japanese wordplay relies on the nuances of the Japanese language and Japanese script for humorous effect. Double entendres have a rich history in Japanese entertainment (such as in kakekotoba) due to the language's large number of homographs (different meanings for a given spelling) and homophones (different meanings for a given pronunciation).

Kakekotoba 

 or "pivot words" are an early form of Japanese wordplay used in waka poetry, wherein some words represent two homonyms. The presence of multiple meanings within these words allowed poets to impart more meaning into fewer words.

Goroawase
 is an especially common form of Japanese wordplay, wherein homophonous words are associated with a given series of letters, numbers or symbols, in order to associate a new meaning with that series. The new words can be used to express a superstition about certain letters or numbers. More commonly, however, goroawase is used as a mnemonic technique, especially in the memorization of numbers such as dates in history, scientific constants and phone numbers.

Numeric substitution
Every digit has a set of possible phonetic values, due to the variety of valid Japanese kanji readings (kun'yomi and on'yomi) and English-origin pronunciations for numbers in Japanese. Often, readings are created by taking the standard reading and retaining only the first syllable (for example, roku becomes ro). Goroawase substitutions are well known as mnemonics, notably in the selection of memorable telephone numbers used by companies and the memorization of numbers such as years in the study of history.

Mnemonics are formed by selecting a suitable reading for a given number; the tables below list the most common readings, though other readings are also possible. Variants of readings may be produced through consonant voicing (via a dakuten or handakuten) or gemination (via a sokuon), vowel lengthening (via a chōonpu), or the insertion of the nasal mora n.

General examples

 16 can be read as "hi-ro", Hiro being a common Japanese given name. 16 is also a common age for anime and manga protagonists (i.e. heroes).
 26 can be read as "fu-ro", meaning "bath". Public baths in Japan have reduced entry fees on the 26th day of every month.
 29 can be read as "ni-ku", meaning "meat". Restaurants and grocery stores have special offers on the 29th day of every month.
39 can be read as "san-kyū", referring to "thank you" in English.
 428 can be read as "shi-bu-ya", referring to the Shibuya area of Tokyo.
 526 can be read as "ko-ji-ro" in reference to Sasaki Kojiro, a samurai from the Edo period.
 634 can be read as "mu-sa-shi". The Tokyo Skytree's height was intentionally set at 634 meters so it would sound like Musashi Province, an old name for the area in which the building stands.
801 can be read as "ya-o-i" or yaoi, a genre of homoerotic manga typically aimed at women.
 893 can be read as "ya-ku-za" or "Yakuza". It is traditionally a bad omen for a student to receive this candidate number for an exam.
 4649 can be read as "yo-ro-shi-ku", meaning "best regards".

As mnemonics
1492, the year of discovery of America, can be read as "i-yo-ku-ni" and appended with "ga mieta" to form the phrase "Alright! I can see land!". Additionally, "i-yo-ku-ni" itself could simply be interpreted as "alright, country". The alternative reading "i-shi-ku-ni" is not typically associated with a particular meaning, but is used to memorize the year.

23564, the length of a sidereal day (23 hours, 56 minutes, 4 seconds), can be read as "ni-san-go-ro-shi", which sounds similar to "nii-san koroshi" or in English, "killing one's older brother".

3.14159265, the first nine digits of pi, can be read as "san-i-shi-i-ko-ku-ni-mu-kou", meaning "an obstetrician faces towards a foreign country."

42.19, the length of a marathon course in kilometres, can be read as "shi-ni-i-ku", meaning "to go to die."

Popular culture examples

Anime, manga, and television 

 152 can be read as "hi-ko-ni", meaning , and is part of the license plate number of the Machine Itashar in Unofficial Sentai Akibaranger.
 18782 + 18782 = 37564 can be read as "i-ya-na-ya-tsu + i-ya-na-ya-tsu = mi-na-go-ro-shi" .
 In Initial D, Rin Hojo's Nissan Skyline GT-R R32 has the number 37654 on its license plate, befitting his nickname of "Shinigami".
 315, or "sa-i-go", is used as a transformation code in Kamen Rider 555: Paradise Lost due to being pronounced similarly to "Psyga".
 39 can be read as "za-ku," referring to the Zaku mecha from the Gundam franchise.
 428, read as "yo-tsu-ba", can refer to the character Yotsuba Nakano from The Quintessential Quintuplets, who wears T-shirts with that number.
 4869 can be read as "shi-ya-ro-ku"; when "ya" is written small, it becomes "sharoku", which resembles . This number is Conan Edogawa's phone PIN and the name of an experimental drug in Case Closed.
 56 can be read as "go-mu", meaning , referring to One Piece protagonist Monkey D. Luffy's elastic abilities.
 59 can be read as "go-ku" and is sometimes used in reference to Goku from Dragon Ball.
 63 can be read as " mu-zan" or "miserable", which refers to Muzan Kibutsuji, the main antagonist of Demon Slayer. The official Demon Slayer Twitter account refers to June 3rd as "Muzan Day".
 723 can be read as "na-tsu-mi" or Natsumi and is commonly used in Sgt. Frog to symbolically refer to the character Natsumi Hinata.
 July 23rd (7/23) is the birthday of Date A Live character Natsumi Kyouno.
 819 can be read as "ha-i-kyū", meaning volleyball. The community around the anime series Haikyu!! considers 19 August (8/19) to be "Haikyu!! Day".
 86239 can be read as "hachi-roku-ni-san-kyū", and was used in Initial D as the number on the license plate of a Toyota 86. It translates to "thank you, eight-six".
 89 years can be read as "ya-ku-sai". This is homophonous with the Japanese word for "calamity" (厄災 yakusai), being a fitting age for the JoJolion character Satoru Akefu, who has a calamity related ability.
 913 can be read as "ka-i-sa", as in Kamen Rider Kaixa, hence it being the transformation activation code.
 An anagram of this is 193, read as "i-ku-sa" (as in Kamen Rider IXA), which serves as the code to activate Rising Mode.

Music 

 382 can be read as "mi-ya-bi", used by Miyavi.
 39 can be read as "mi-ku", usually in reference to the Vocaloid character Hatsune Miku.
 610 can be read as "ro-ten" or "rotten", and is often used on merchandise of the rock band ROTTENGRAFFTY.
 616 can be read as "ro-i-ro", referring to lowiro, the developer and publisher of the rhythm game Arcaea.
 712 can be read as "na-i-fu" (i.e. knife), and is used in the Shonen Knife album 712.
 75, read as "na-ko", is used by Nako Yabuki in her Instagram and Twitter handles.

Video games 

 193, when read as "i-ku-sa" and interpreted to mean "Iku-san", can refer to Touhou Project character Iku Nagae, or IJN submarine I-19 in Kantai Collection.
 2424 can be read as Puyo Puyo. This numerical correspondence has been used and referenced ever since the series' debut, and has also been used in various teasers for some of the games. The series celebrated its 24th anniversary in 2015.
 283 can be read as "tsu-ba-sa", meaning "wing". This is used for the name of the 283 Production agency in THE iDOLM@STER: Shiny Colors.
 315 can be read as "sa-i-kō", meaning "highest", "supreme", or "ultimate". This is used as the name for 315 Production in The Idolmaster SideM, where the idols under the label use "saikō" as a rallying chant.
 34 is a frequent target of goroawase in the mystery franchise When They Cry, often being the name of the culprit or an accomplice, such as Miyo in Higurashi When They Cry, Sayo in Umineko When They Cry, and Mitsuyo in Ciconia When They Cry.
 346 can be read as "mi-shi-ro", meaning "beautiful castle". This is used for the name of 346 Production in THE iDOLM@STER: Cinderella Girls.
 51 can be read as "go-ichi". These two numbers are the latter part of "SUDA51", the alias of Goichi Suda.
 573 can be read as "ko-na-mi" and is often used by Konami; for example, it is used in Konami telephone numbers and as a high score in Konami games, as well as in promotional materials and sometimes as a character name.
 .59 can be read as "ten-go-ku", meaning "heaven" (an example being the song ".59" in Beatmania IIDX 2nd Style and Dance Dance Revolution 4thMix).
 765 can be read as "na-mu-ko" or Namco. Derivatives of this number can be found in dozens of Namco-produced video games. It was also the central studio of The Idolmaster and its sequels.
 After merging with Bandai, their goroawase number became 876 (ba-na-mu); the handle of Bandai Namco Games' Japanese Twitter account is "@bnei876".
 86 can be read as "ha-ru" or HAL. HAL Laboratory often puts this number somewhere in the video games it creates as parts of secrets and easter eggs, most notably in the Kirby series.

Other 
15 can be read as "ichi-go" and is commonly used to refer to strawberries ("ichigo"). It can also mean "strawberry face", a term used to describe equipping the front end of a Nissan Silvia (S15) onto another S-chassis car.
 23 can be read as "ni-san". Car manufacturer Nissan frequently enters cars with the number 23 into motorsports events.
 2434 can be read as "ni-ji-san-ji", which refers to the virtual YouTuber agency Nijisanji. Some Japanese members of the company use this number in their Twitter handles.
2525 can be read as "ni-ko-ni-ko" and refers to Niconico, a Japanese online video platform. Its "mylists", which function similarly to lists of bookmarks, are limited to 25 per user.
510, read as "go-tō", is used by professional wrestler Hirooki Goto in his Twitter handle.

 563 can be read as "ko-ro-san"; amounts of 563 yen are commonly donated to virtual YouTuber Inugami Korone of Hololive Production, who is sometimes referred to as "Koro-san".
Hololive founder Motoaki "YAGOO" Tanigo's nickname is occasionally represented with the number 85 ("ya-go") or 850 ("ya-go-ō").

 69 can be read as "ro-ki", as in Hi69 ("Hiroki"), one of the ring names of professional wrestler Hiroki Tanabe.

See also 
 Japanese rebus monogram
 Rebus § Japan
 Tetraphobia
 Word play

Notes

References 

Mnemonics
Japanese word games